Digenis Neochori Football Club is a Greek football club based in Oichalia, Trikala, Greece.

Honours

Domestic

 Trikala FCA Champions: 7
 1980–81, 1986–87, 1989–90, 1992–93, 2016–17, 2018–19, 2021-22
 '''Trikala FCA Cup Winners: 5
 1982–83, 1986–87, 2016–17, 2017–18

References

Trikala (regional unit)
Association football clubs established in 1956
1956 establishments in Greece
Gamma Ethniki clubs